Cakile maritima, sea rocket (Britain and Ireland) or European searocket (North America), is a common plant in the mustard family Brassicaceae. It is widespread in Europe, North Africa and western Asia, especially on coastlines. It can now be found in many other areas of the world where it has been introduced. It is present on the west and east coasts of North America, where it has the potential to become an invasive species. This is an annual plant which grows in clumps or mounds in the sand on beaches and bluffs. The shiny leaves are fleshy, green and tinted with purple or magenta, and long-lobed. It has white to light purple flowers and sculpted, segmented, corky brown fruits one to three centimetres long. The fruits float and are water-dispersed.

Description
It is a glabrous, succulent annual, with a slender or stout taproot. The lobed leaves, are flesh-like and alternately spaced on the stem. They are different at the top and bottom of the stem; the lower leaves are obovate or oblanceolate, while the upper ones are oblong. It blooms in the UK, between June and August. Later it produces green maturing to brown, with short, stubby seed capsules. They contain two yellow or brown, smooth seeds. The seed oil contains a high level of erucic acid.

Phytochemistry
Due to its highly efficient antioxidant system, it can withstand even high doses of Cadmium pollution.

Taxonomy
It was published and described by Giovanni Antonio Scopoli in 'Fl. Carniol.' edition 2, Vol.2 on page 35, in 1772.

The Latin specific epithet maritima means "of the sea".

Subspecies
 Cakile maritima subsp. integrifolia (Hornem.) Hyl. ex Greuter & Burdet  from the Canary Islands and Morocco.

Distribution and habitat

Cakile maritima is native to temperate areas of North Africa, western Asia and Europe.

Range
It is found in Africa within Algeria, the Canary Islands, Egypt, Libya, the Madeira Islands, Morocco and Tunisia.
In Western Asia, it is found in the Caucasus, Georgia, Iran, Israel, Syria and Turkey. In Eastern Europe, it is found in Estonia and Ukraine. In middle Europe, it is found within Belgium, Germany, the Netherlands and Poland. In Northern Europe, in Denmark, Finland, Iceland, Norway and the United Kingdom. In South-eastern Europe, within Albania, Bulgaria, Croatia, Greece, Italy, Montenegro, Romania, Serbia and Slovenia. In Southwestern Europe, within France, Portugal and Spain.
It is also widely naturalised outside of its native range, in North America.

Habitat
It grows on the foreshores near large dune systems, and in shingle banks. It is tolerant of salt spray and transient seawater inundation. It is pollinated by a wide range of insects, from Apis mellifera, Eristalis intricarius and Pieris rapae.

Veterinary significance
As the seed oil contains a high level of erucic acid it can have pathological effects on the cardiac muscle of several animal species. However, orange-bellied parrots feed on its seed during their northward migrating journey from Tasmania and Australia.

Uses
The leaves are edible, preferably cooked, and not eaten in great quantity. The seed oil can be used for industrial applications.

References

External links
 
Jepson Manual Treatment
USDA Plants Profile
Plant-identification
Photo gallery

Brassicaceae
Flora of North Africa
Flora of Algeria
Flora of the Canary Islands
Flora of Egypt
Flora of Libya
Flora of Madeira
Flora of Morocco
Flora of Tunisia
Flora of the Caucasus
Flora of Georgia (country)
Flora of Iran
Flora of Israel
Flora of Palestine (region)
Flora of Syria
Flora of Turkey
Flora of Europe
Flora of Estonia
Flora of Ukraine
Flora of Belgium
Flora of Germany
Flora of the Netherlands
Flora of Poland
Flora of Denmark
Flora of Finland
Flora of Iceland
Flora of Norway
Flora of Albania
Flora of Bulgaria
Flora of Croatia
Flora of Greece
Flora of Italy
Flora of Montenegro
Flora of Romania
Flora of Serbia
Flora of Slovenia
Flora of Portugal
Flora of Spain
Flora of the United Kingdom
Leaf vegetables
Plants described in 1772
Taxa named by Giovanni Antonio Scopoli